Topic Continuity in Discourse—subtitled A Quantitative Cross Language Study—is a book edited by Talmy Givón, with contributions by himself and other experts in various languages. It is part of the series Typological Studies in Language (a supplement series to the academic journal Studies in Language) and was published by John Benjamins in 1983.

The book presents a cross-linguistic hierarchy of natural language "syntactic coding of topic accessibility" (including, for example, discourse participant prominence). Givón describes the aim of the research, documented in the book, as "the rather ambitious goal ... to define, in a preliminary but cross-linguistically stable fashion, the basic principles of iconicity underlying the syntactic coding of the topic identification domain."

Givón's starting point was his previously published (1978, 1979, 1981 and 1982) one-dimensional scale. As listed by him, from "most continuous/accessible topic" to "most discontinuous/inaccessible topic" this was as follows:
 zero anaphora
 unstressed-bound pronouns and grammatical agreement
 stressed-independent pronouns
 right-dislocated definite noun phrases (NP)
 neutral-ordered NPs
 left-dislocated NPs
 Y-moved NPs (or "contrastive topicalization")
 cleft and focus constructions
 referential indefinite NPs

The language specific studies provided in the book are on Japanese, Amharic, Ute, Biblical Hebrew, Latin-American Spanish, written English, spoken English, Hausa and Chamorro. The data from these languages were analysed according to a common methodology, explained by Givón in the introduction to the book, and agreed upon by all the other contributors. The methodology involved quantitative measurements, which although statistical, were designed to be repeatable and applicable to any language.

See also 

 Cognitive science
 Context
 Cotext
 Human universals
 Language universals
 Pragmatics
 Psycholinguistics
 Sociolinguistics
 Universal grammar

Notes and references

Bibliography 

 Givón, Talmy. Topic Continuity in Discourse: A Quantitative Cross Language Study. Typological Studies in Language 3. Amsterdam: John Benjamins, 1983.

External links 
 Topic Continuity in Discourse — overview of book provided by publisher

Pragmatics works
1983 non-fiction books